The 1936–37 Yugoslav Ice Hockey League season was the inaugural season of the Yugoslav Ice Hockey League. The championship was won by Ilrija, which was recognized as the best Yugoslav team at the time by the national federation.

References

Yugo
Yugoslav Ice Hockey League seasons
1936–37 in Yugoslav ice hockey